Ulstein Group is a group of companies that focus on various marine-related industries, but is mainly known for its shipbuilding and ship design activities. The largest unit is Ulstein Verft AS.
The company's head office and primary operations are located in the town of Ulsteinvik in the municipality of Ulstein in Møre og Romsdal county, Norway, an important area for the Norwegian maritime cluster, and with subsidiaries in several other countries.
The group also includes companies working with power & control systems and solutions, engineering, site follow-up and aftermarket services. The company has also been engaged in shipping.

History
The original company, Ulstein Mekaniske Verksted, was established in 1917 by Martin Ulstein and his brother-in-law Andreas Flø.   At age 23, Martin and Andreas founded the company to modify local fishing boats, which were undergoing a global transition from sail-power to motorization. Martin Ulstein borrowed money from Ulstein Sparebank, with his father acting as guarantor, acquired  of land from his uncle and set up shop with his brother-in-law and business partner Andreas Flø.

After Martin Ulstein's sudden death, his widow Inga took the position as Head of the Board, a position she held for many years. Their six children, Dagny, Inger, Magnulf, Kolbein, Idar, and Ragnhild (especially Kolbein and Idar) were responsible for the growth of the company to around 4,000 people at the end of the 1990s.  

Vickers acquired Ulstein Group AS except the shipbuilding division in 1999, then Rolls-Royce acquired Vickers a few months later.

The new shipbuilding division was demerged and named UMV Holding and forms the basis for today’s new Ulstein Group. In 2000, the new design activity in Ulstein was established (currently: Ulstein Design & Solutions AS) which began developing Ulstein designs.   The ULSTEIN X-BOW®, the inverted bow concept, redefined marine engineering. The bow concept was launched in 2005, together with the first shipbuilding contract, and gained immediate interest from shipowners. 

CEO of Ulstein Group is Cathrine Kristiseter Marti. 
Still family-owned, a representative of the third generation, Tore Ulstein, is chairman of the board.

Divisions

Ulstein Verft AS
Ulstein Verft AS is a shipyard situated in Ulstein Group's primary base of operations, Ulsteinvik.  Ulstein Verft was established in 1917, and is the largest employer in the group. The yard specialises in constructing advanced vessels, the latest being cable laying vessels, offshore wind service vessels, expedition cruise vessels, yachts and passenger (RoPax) vessels. Focusing on newbuilds and larger conversions, the yard also takes on service and aftermarket assignments such as docking, mooring, classifications, upgrades, maintenance and repair, crane lifts and barge transportation. Many, but not all, vessels built are based on Ulstein's own design, the 'Ulstein design' for which two hull line innovations are often implemented, the inverted bow, X-BOW®, and the X-STERN® hull design shapes. Two recent deliveries were the cable-laying vessel Nexans Aurora (2021) and the expedition cruise vessel 'National Geographic Resolution' (2021).

Ulstein Elektro Installasjon AS
Ulstein Elektro Installasjon AS is part of the shipbuilding division in ULSTEIN. The company is responsible for electrical installations on board vessels at Ulstein Verft.

Ulstein Design & Solutions AS
Ulstein Design & Solutions AS is located in Ulsteinvik, Norway. The company develops ship designs and offers complete equipment packages for ship construction worldwide. The designs include vessels for the offshore renewables market (offshore wind), passenger vessels, cruise vessels and yachts, fisheries, and the offshore oil and gas market (Offshore Construction (OCV), IMR vessels, cable laying, platform supply vessels (PSVs) and Anchor handling tug supply vessels. Services also include CFD analyses, project management, site supervision, installation and commissioning as well as redesigns for conversions and upgrades. Ten years after the company introduced the patented X-BOW® (Inverted bow) the number of such designs sold passed the 100-mark. An add-on for the ship's stern, the X-STERN, was launched in 2014, and received the Next Generation Ship Award 2015. A third hull innovation, the TWIN X-STERN, was firstly contracted for offshore wind service vessels in 2022.

Ulstein Design & Solutions BV
Ulstein Design & Solutions BV designs large offshore construction vessels. The company develops projects for operators, contractors and ship owners in the offshore drilling, renewables, heavy-lift, construction and production market, as well as the maritime transport (feeder) market. Future market trends and end-user needs are the key drivers for developing and providing their new floating concepts to the offshore wind industry and the offshore oil and gas industries. One of the latest projects is its design for a semi-submersible foundation installation vessel, Seaway 7's Seaway Alfa Lift.

Ulstein Power & Control AS
Ulstein Power & Control offers worldwide services and retrofit of power packages and marine automation systems.

Ulstein Poland LTD. SP. Z.O.O.
Ulstein Poland is a part of an engineering pool in Ulstein Group and provides engineering services, as well as hull, outfitting and machinery documentation and on-site yard support.

Ulstein Marine Systems (Shanghai) Co. Ltd.
Ulstein Marine Systems (Shanghai) is a marketing and sales office based in China. The company offers engineering capacities and site support to Ulstein's ship design activities in China.

Ulstein Marine Equipment (Ningbo) Co. Ltd.
Ulstein Marine Equipment (Ningbo) manufactures electrical components and systems for offshore vessels developed by ULSTEIN.

Ulstein Electrical Technology (Ningbo) Co. Ltd.
Ulstein Electrical Technology (Ningbo) is engaged in technical consulting, installation, commissioning and after-sales service.

Ulstein International AS
Ulstein International is located in Ulsteinvik, Norway, and has a worldwide presence by managing the global sales activities in Ulstein Group and supporting and facilitating international growth. Engaged in consulting, project establishments and business development.

Blue Ctrl AS 
Blue Ctrl develops and delivers future-oriented, reliable marine automation and control systems. Its automation products are based on the future-oriented automation platform X-CONNECT®, which makes it easy and efficient for partners to configure and automatically update and implement automation systems on board vessels. Ulstein holds 50 per cent ownership in this company.

ULSTEIN X-BOW

The ULSTEIN X-BOW, an inverted bow, introduces the gentle displacer, ship's bow a tapered fore ship shape with a different volume distribution as well as sectional angles, resulting in a wave piercing effect at small wave heights, and also reduces pitching and bow impact loads in bigger seas. The anchorhandling tug supply vessel, Bourbon Orca, built for Bourbon Offshore Norway, was the first ship built with the ULSTEIN X-BOW in 2006. In 2017, Norges Bank, the Central Bank of Norway, introduced a new series of banknotes, with the X-BOW featured on the NOK 100 note.  In (2019), the X-BOW was introduced to the cruise industry. Later developments from the X-BOW include the X-STERN,  which introduces the documented X-BOW® effect to the aft ship, and the TWIN X-STERN  for improved operability and fuel efficiency.

References

Further reading
 Lloyd's maritime directory, Lloyd's of London Press, 2004: 
 Lloyd's ship manager: LSM, Lloyd's of London Press: 2003

Shipbuilding companies of Norway
Companies based in Møre og Romsdal
Design companies established in 1917
Manufacturing companies established in 1917
Dutch companies established in 1917